Soyuz TM-14 was the 14th expedition to the Mir space station. It included an astronaut from Germany, and was the first Russian Soyuz mission after the collapse of the Soviet Union.

Crew

Mission highlights

Klaus Dietrich Flade became the second German to visit a space station when he reached Mir with the Vityaz crew. The first was Sigmund Jähn of East Germany, who visited Salyut 6 in 1978. Flade conducted 14 German experiments as part of Germany's preparation for participation in the Freedom and Columbus space station projects.

Suffered a landing system malfunction, causing its descent module to turn over. It came to rest upside down, trapping its occupants inside until it could be righted.

References

Crewed Soyuz missions
Spacecraft launched in 1992
Space programme of Germany